Mount Cobb is the name of several places:

In Australia
Mount Cobb (Australia), a mountain in South Australia

In Canada
Mount Cobb (British Columbia), a mountain on Vancouver Island

In New Zealand
Mount Cobb, New Zealand, a mountain in the Tasman Region

In the United States
Mount Cobb, Pennsylvania, a township in Lackawanna County
Mount Cobb (Vermont), a mountain in Washington County